Teodosio Heikenrath was a clergyman and bishop for the Roman Catholic Diocese of Wewak. He was appointed bishop in 1922. He died in 1923.

References 

1923 deaths
Roman Catholic bishops of Wewak